

TANIQ 

TANIQ is a Dutch based company that develops technology for manufacturers to improve the design and production of  Reinforced rubber products. The company is a spin-off from the Aerospace department of Delft University of Technology. TANIQ’s expertise is optimizing reinforcement structures of rubber products. Their mission statement is to automate both the design and production process of a large group of industrial rubber products that is still manufactured manually today. Therefore they have developed special software to automate the design of reinforced rubber products. Furthermore, they have developed and supply equipment to automate the production processes. The equipment comprises industrial robots for automated placement of rubber and fiber layers. The goal is to achieve a repeatable high product performance and to reduce material and labor costs.

Products & Services
TANIQ is no manufacturer but an R&D company that develops technology for manufacturers of reinforced rubber products. The company has three products and services:

1. Design and development of reinforced rubber products (inc. FEA simulations, prototyping and testing)

2. Development and supply of robotic equipment (automated winding of rubber and fiber layers)

3.  Development and licensing of Reinforced Rubber Pro Software (Design and production software)

Industries & Applications

TANIQ’s technology is used for reinforced rubber products in various industries such as the chemical, dredging, civil engineering, defense and rescue industry. The applications which benefit from TANIQ's technology are mainly products which are now manufactured manually and /or using fabric reinforced rubber sheets. The reasons to apply the technology are to improve performance or reduce (material and production) costs.

Examples of applications are:

Rubber bellows
Rubber Expansion joint
Reinforced rubber hoses 
Pipe-plugs and pipe-stoppers
Turbo charger hose
Dredge hoses 
Kink-free garden hoses 
Flexible actuators and pneumatic muscles 
Elbows and reducers

References

External links 

-	Reinforced rubber technology, TANIQ (retrieved 20 December 2010)
-	Delft University of Technology Spin-off, (retrieved 29 November 2011)

Manufacturing companies of the Netherlands